Jean-Pierre Wimille (26 February 1908 – 28 January 1949) was a Grand Prix motor racing driver and a member of the French Resistance during World War II.

Biography
Born in Paris, France to a father who loved motor sports and was employed as the motoring correspondent for the Petit Parisien newspaper, Jean-Pierre Wimille developed a fascination with racing cars at a young age. He was 22 years old when he made his Grand Prix debut, driving a Bugatti 37A at the 1930 French Grand Prix in Pau.

Career

Driving a Bugatti T51, in 1932 he won the La Turbie hill climb, the Grand Prix de Lorraine and the Grand Prix d'Oran. In 1934 he was the victor at the Algerian Grand Prix in Algiers driving a Bugatti T59 and in January 1936 he finished second in the South African Grand Prix held at the Prince George Circuit in East London, South Africa then won the French Grand Prix in his home country.

Still in France, that same year he won the Deauville Grand Prix, a race held on the city's streets. Wimille won in his Bugatti T59 in an accident-marred race that killed drivers Raymond Chambost and Marcel Lehoux in separate incidents. Of the 16 cars that started the race, only three managed to finish.

In 1936, Wimille traveled to Long Island, New York to compete in the Vanderbilt Cup where he finished 2nd, behind the winner, Tazio Nuvolari. He also competed in the 24 hours of Le Mans endurance race, winning in 1937 and again in 1939.

World War II
When World War II came, following the Nazi occupation Wimille and fellow Grand Prix race drivers Robert Benoist and William Grover-Williams joined the Special Operations Executive, which aided the French Resistance. Of the three, Wimille was the only one to survive.

Post World War II
Jean-Pierre Wimille married Christiane de la Fressange with whom he had a son, François born in 1946. At the end of the War, he became the No. 1 driver for the Alfa Romeo team between 1946 and 1948, winning several Grand Prix races including his second French Grand Prix. He had a long standing affair with French Singer Juliette Greco, who he met in 1947 at the Tabou in Paris.

From 1946 on, Wimille built and designed cars in Paris under the brand-name Wimille. Between 1946 and 1950 around eight cars were built, at first with Citroën-engines, later with Ford V8-engines.

Jean-Pierre Wimille died when he lost control of his Simca-Gordini and crashed into a tree during practice runs for the 1949 Buenos Aires Grand Prix. He is buried in the Cimetière de Passy in Paris. There is a memorial to him at the Porte Dauphine on the edge of the Bois de Boulogne in Paris.

Racing record
Some of Jean-Pierre Wimille's race victories:

1932:
Grand Prix de Lorraine
Grand Prix d'Oran

1934:
Grand Prix of Algeria – Bugatti T59

1936:
French Grand Prix – Bugatti T57G
Grand Prix de la Marne – Bugatti T57G
Deauville Grand Prix – Bugatti T59
Grand Prix du Comminges – Bugatti T59/57

1937:
Pau Grand Prix – Bugatti T57G (The Tank)
Grand Prix de Böne – Bugatti T57
24 hours of Le Mans – Bugatti T57G driving with Robert Benoist
Grand Prix de la Marne – Bugatti T57

1939:
Coupe de Paris
Grand Prix du Centenaire Luxembourg – Bugatti T57S45
24 hours of Le Mans – Bugatti T57C driving with Pierre Veyron

Post War – 1945:
Coupe des Prisonniers – Bugatti sprint car

1946:
Coupe de la Résistance – Alfa Romeo 308
Grand Prix du Roussillon – Alfa Romeo 308
Grand Prix de Bourgogne – Alfa Romeo 308
Grand Prix des Nations – Geneva (Heat 1) – Alfa Romeo 158

1947:
Swiss Grand Prix – Alfa Romeo 158
Belgian Grand Prix – Alfa Romeo 158
Coupe de Paris

1948:
Grand Prix de Rosario – Simca- Gordini 15
French Grand Prix – Alfa Romeo 158
Italian Grand Prix – Alfa Romeo 158
Autodrome Grand Prix – Alfa Romeo 158/47

Complete European Championship results
(key) (Races in bold indicate pole position) (Races in italics indicate fastest lap)

Post WWII Grandes Épreuves results
(key) (Races in bold indicate pole position) (Races in italics indicate fastest lap)

Complete 24 Hours of Le Mans results

References

Bibliography
 Paris, Jean-Michel and Mearns, William D: "Jean-Pierre Wimille: à bientôt la revanche", Editions Drivers, Toulouse, 2002, 
 Saward, Joe: "The Grand Prix Saboteurs", Morienval Press, London, 2006,

External links

 Grand Prix History – Hall of Fame , Jean-Pierre Wimille
 Jean-Pierre Wimille grave photos at Cimetière de Passy  

1908 births
1949 deaths
French Resistance members
Recipients of the Legion of Honour
French racing drivers
Grand Prix drivers
Bugatti people
Racing drivers who died while racing
24 Hours of Le Mans drivers
24 Hours of Le Mans winning drivers
Sport deaths in Argentina
Burials at Passy Cemetery
French Special Operations Executive personnel
European Championship drivers
Racing drivers from Paris